Mahmood Hamid (born January 19, 1969, Karachi, Sindh) is a Pakistani former cricketer who played one One Day International (ODI) in 1995. He scored one run before being run out. In February 2020, he was named in Pakistan's squad for the Over-50s Cricket World Cup in South Africa. However, the tournament was cancelled during the third round of matches due to the coronavirus pandemic.

References

External links

1969 births
Living people
Pakistan One Day International cricketers
Pakistani cricketers
United Bank Limited cricketers
Pakistan National Shipping Corporation cricketers
Karachi Whites cricketers
Karachi Blues cricketers
Pakistan International Airlines cricketers
Karachi cricketers
Cricketers from Karachi